Milka Bjelica (born 22 June 1981 in Belgrade, SFR Yugoslavia) is Montenegrin former women's basketball player. She has a younger brother, Milko and sister Ana. Milko is a basketball player and Ana is a volleyball player. Their parents are also former players.

References

External links
Profile at eurobasket.com

1981 births
Living people
Basketball players from Belgrade
Montenegrin women's basketball players
Serbian women's basketball players
Serbian sports agents
ŽKK Crvena zvezda players
Serbian people of Montenegrin descent
Montenegrin people of Serbian descent
Centers (basketball)
ŽKK Vršac players
Women sports agents
Montenegrin expatriate basketball people in Italy
Montenegrin expatriate basketball people in Spain
Montenegrin expatriate basketball people in Lithuania
Montenegrin expatriate basketball people in Poland
Montenegrin expatriate basketball people in Romania
Montenegrin expatriate basketball people in Turkey
Montenegrin expatriate basketball people in the Czech Republic
Montenegrin expatriate basketball people in Belgium